Vachellia hindsii is a tree which grows up to  tall, and is native to parts of southern Mexico and parts of Central America.

References

hindsii
Flora of Central America